The Creston News Advertiser is a daily newspaper in Creston, Iowa, United States. It was started by Frank B. Thayer and Joel R. Hill, a Kansas City banker, in 1928 as a result of the merger of two newspapers, the Creston Evening News and the Creston Daily Advertiser. Creston Evening News was founded as a weekly in 1879 and began daily circulation in 1881. The paper remains a daily circulation, with carriers delivering papers in the afternoon.

It also includes news formerly published by the Fontanelle Observer and the Adair County Free Press. Staff for the News Advertiser also write for the Osceola Sentinel Tribune, located in Osceola. 

Creston News Advertiser is published by Creston Publishing Company and is published in house.

References

External links
Official website

Newspapers published in Iowa
1928 establishments in Iowa
Publications established in 1928